Roy Meeus (born 24 May 1989) is a Belgian professional footballer.

Career
Born in Lommel, Belgium, Meeus has played for KVSK United, Club Brugge, Dender, and Lommel United.

Personal life
Meeus married Ashlee Bond, an American-Israeli Olympic show jumping rider who competes for Israel, in 2015 and they have a daughter named Scottie, born in 2016.

References

External links
 

1989 births
Living people
Belgian footballers
Club Brugge KV players
F.C.V. Dender E.H. players
Lommel S.K. players
K.F.C. Dessel Sport players
Orange County SC players
Belgian Pro League players
Challenger Pro League players
USL Championship players
People from Lommel
Association football midfielders
Belgian expatriate footballers
Belgian expatriates in the United States
Expatriate soccer players in the United States
Footballers from Limburg (Belgium)